Carl Vandyk (17 January 1851 – 18 November 1931) was a successful London photographer born in Bunde, Germany. From 1882 he owned a studio at Gloucester Road taking images of the British Royal Family including Queen Victoria, King George V as well as other notables such as Alexander I of Yugoslavia, Christian X of Denmark, Buffalo Bill and Enrico Caruso. From 1901 the studio moved to Buckingham Palace Road, London.

Carl became a British citizen on 4 February 1886.

Carl's son Herbert Vandyk (1879–1943) took over the family business in 1913 after studying in London, Berlin and Paris and went on to accumulate 22 Royal Warrants.

Carl Vandyk owned three London hotels close to his studios:
 The Rembrandt Hotel, Thurloe Place, London SW
 The Rubens Hotel, Buckingham Palace Road, London SW
 The Vandyke Hotel, Cromwell Road, London SW7

Carl had two brothers, Aaron Vandyke (1843–1892) and Herman Vandyke (a.k.a. Hyman) (a.k.a. Vandyck) (1838–1919) who were also in the photographic trade. Aaron had studios in Liverpool from c.1869 until c.1902  and Herman in West London from c.1881 until c.1904.

References

External links 
    
 
 

19th-century English photographers
British portrait photographers
1851 births
1931 deaths
People from Leer (district)
Photographers from London